Andreas Kyburz  (born 5 May 1988) is a Swiss orienteering competitor. He was born in Rheinfelden. He won a bronze medal in the sprint at the 2018 World Orienteering Championships in Latvia, behind Daniel Hubmann and Tim Robertson. At the 2016 European Orienteering Championships he won a bronze medal in the sprint relay with the Swiss team.

His brother Matthias Kyburz is also an international orienteering competitor.

References

External links
 
 

Swiss orienteers
Male orienteers
1988 births
Living people
People from Rheinfelden District
Sportspeople from Aargau